Pazhassi Raja N. S. S. College, Mattanur, also locally known as Mattanur College, is a Post Graduate college run by the Nair Service Society. It was established in 1964 as a junior college. It was upgraded as a Degree College in 1967 and as a Post Graduate institution in 1999.

Courses
Under Graduate programmes:

 B.A Hindi
 B.A History
 B.A Economics
 B.A English
 B.Sc. Mathematics
 B.Sc. Physics
 B.Sc. Chemistry
 B.Sc. Zoology
 B.Com. Finance

Post Graduate programmes:

 M.Com. Taxation
 M.Sc. Mathematics

Affiliation
Pazhassi Raja N. S. S. College is affiliated to the Kannur University and UGC.

Notable alumni
 K. K. Shailaja Teacher, Former Minister of Health and Social Welfare, Kerala pursued B.Sc Physics.
 Sreenivasan, Screenwriter, Film director, Film produce. pursued B.A Economics.
 Salim Ahamed, Film director, screenwriter, film producer. pursued B.Com (Commerce)
 P. Sankaran, Former Member of Parliament

See also
 S.E.S. College, Sreekandapuram
 Krishna Menon Women's College
 Kannur University
 Sir Syed College
 Payyannur College

References

Colleges affiliated to Kannur University
Universities and colleges in Kannur district